WKEZ  (1240 AM, "98.7 EZ-FM") is a radio station licensed to Bluefield, West Virginia. Owned by Charles Spencer and Rick Lambert, through licensee First Media Services, LLC, it broadcasts a soft adult contemporary format.

History
On September 14, 2016, WKEZ changed their format from classic country to classic hip hop, branded as "G98.7", simulcasting on FM translator W254CV 98.7 FM Bluefield.

Alpha Media sold its Bluefield cluster to First Media Services in September 2018. In December 2018, WKEZ rebranded as "Z98.7", with no change in format.

In November 2019, WKEZ began stunting with Christmas music as "Christmas 98.7". At midnight on January 1, 2020, the station flipped to soft adult contemporary as "98.7 EZ-FM". The new format is also simulcast by WELC 1150 AM Welch.

References

External links

Soft adult contemporary radio stations in the United States
Radio stations established in 1948
KEZ